is an autobahn in Braunschweig, also known as the Braunschweiger Westtangente. Its purpose is to connect the A 2 with the A 39, passing the city of Braunschweig on the western side.

Exit list 

 

 

|}

External links 

391
A391
Transport in Braunschweig